The Young People's Concerts with the New York Philharmonic are the longest-running series of family concerts of classical music in the world.

Genesis
They began in 1924 under the direction of "Uncle" Ernest Schelling. Earlier Family Matinees had begun as far back as 1885 under conductor Theodore Thomas. Josef Stránský developed them further under the name Young People's Concerts beginning in 1914. They have run uninterrupted under this name since 1926. Schelling led his first Young People's Concert on March 27, 1924. By combining musical performances of the Philharmonic with lectures, Schelling set the stage for the program.

Leonard Bernstein's Young People's Concerts on CBS (1958–72)

Leonard Bernstein brought the Young People's Concerts to a new level of attention when he arrived as conductor of the New York Philharmonic in 1958. Crucially, the first performance with him as music director, on January 18, 1958, at Carnegie Hall, New York City, was the first of these concerts to be televised. Beginning in 1962, the Young People's Concerts became the first series of concerts ever televised from Lincoln Center. Bernstein conducted a total of 53 such performances, all of which were telecast on CBS and syndicated in over 40 countries. Bernstein continued the concerts even during a sabbatical season from the orchestra 1964–65. Although Bernstein left as music director in 1969, he continued to lead the Young People's Concerts as Conductor Emeritus until 1972. Bernstein's performances inspired generations of musicians and music-lovers, and all of them are now available on DVD. However, the airing of the program was halted in March 1972, with a final Young People's Concert concentrating on Gustav Holst's The Planets.

Originally broadcast on Saturday (episodes 1–7) and Sunday (episodes 8–15), the concerts moved to prime time for episodes 16–40. This was likely a CBS counter to Newton N. Minow’s speech referring to television as a vast wasteland. The series returned to Sunday afternoons (episodes 41–53). The concerts were also syndicated to forty countries.

Kultur International Films released Volume I on DVD in 2004 and Volume II on DVD in 2013. Each volume contains more than twenty hours of concerts.

Young People's Concerts after Bernstein

Each season, several different conductors led the Young People's Concerts. Michael Tilson Thomas became a regular during the 1970s, but other conductors included figures like Erich Leinsdorf, Pierre Boulez, Igor Buketoff, Zubin Mehta, Aaron Copland, and later Kurt Masur, Leonard Slatkin, and André Previn.

Currently, the New York Philharmonic presents four Young People's Concerts each season, in addition to concerts on tour, most recently in Hong Kong on February 17, 2008. In New York, Delta David Gier is conductor and host—the first person to lead all such concerts in a season since 1952. Each season is themed as a unit—for instance the four ages of music—and the live performance is complemented by live images projected on a large screen, in addition to actors, dancers, and singers who help bring themes to life. Noted playwright Tom Dulack scripts the concerts. Each concert is preceded by Kidzone Live, an interactive music fair engaging over 1000 children in the themes of the concert with hands-on activities on all four level of the lobby of Avery Fisher Hall.

In 2005, the New York Philharmonic initiated a sister series called Very Young People's Concerts, performed by an ensemble of eight to ten musicians of the Philharmonic at Merkin Concert Hall. Children arrive for musical games played with individual musicians, then sit down for a 30-minute concert featuring a story set to a major piece of music, like one of The Four Seasons of Vivaldi, or a portion of Maurice Ravel's String Quartet in F. Children try small string instruments before they leave. The Very Young People's Concerts also sell out on subscription.

References

Further reading
Leonard Bernstein's Young People's Concerts. Edited by Jack Gottlieb. New York: Doubleday, 1970.
Olsen, Kathleen A. The Contributions of Leonard Bernstein to Music Education and Audience Development. Master's thesis from The Crane School of Music, Potsdam New York, 2009.
Schonberg, Harold C. "Bernstein Offers a Lesson in Music", The New York Times, 19 January 1958, p. 81.

External links
 "Leonard Bernstein's Young People's Concerts", TheTVDB (includes a list of all episodes)
 Bernstein's Studio, which includes some audio clips
 "Young People's Concerts Scripts" (Bernstein), Library of Congress

Recurring events established in 1924
1958 American television series debuts
1972 American television series endings
Concerts
Music education in the United States
CBS original programming
Leonard Bernstein